Artur Avakyants (born 30 September 1972) is a Kazakhstani football manager and a former player. He is the manager of Russian club Peresvet Domodedovo.

Career
He played for the club FC Akzhayik.

References
 
 

1972 births
People from Martuni Province
Kazakhstani people of Armenian descent
Living people
Soviet footballers
Kazakhstani footballers
Association football midfielders
FC Akzhayik players
FC Kaisar players
FC Zhetysu players
FC Caspiy players
Soviet Second League players
Soviet Second League B players
Kazakhstan Premier League players
Kazakhstan First Division players
Kazakhstani football managers
FC Akzhayik managers
Kazakhstan Premier League managers
Kazakhstani expatriate football managers
Expatriate football managers in Russia
Kazakhstani expatriate sportspeople in Russia